Rocky Tuan Sung-chi is a Hong Kong medical researcher and bioengineer, currently the vice-chancellor and president of the Chinese University of Hong Kong, where he served as distinguished visiting professor and director of the Institute for Tissue Engineering and Regenerative Medicine prior to taking up the vice-chancellorship. Previously he was on the faculty at the University of Pittsburgh, where he held a number of roles: Arthur J. Rooney Sr. Professor of Sports Medicine and the executive vice chair of the department of Orthopaedic Surgery, and a professor in the department of bioengineering. He was the director of the Center for Military Medicine Research and an associate director of the McGowan Institute for Regenerative Medicine. Despite his position in Hong Kong, he continues to serve as the director of the University of Pittsburgh's Center for Cellular and Molecular Engineering. For the 2018 fiscal year, he was one of the top 25 highest-paid University of Pittsburgh employees.

Tuan's research efforts focus on bioengineering applied to the musculoskeletal system.

Education
Born in Hong Kong to Republic of China Army veterans, Tuan completed primary and secondary education at St. Joseph's Anglo-Chinese School, and then attended briefly the Queen's College without sitting the matriculation examination. He received his B.A. degree in chemistry from Berea College in Kentucky in 1972. He received his Ph.D. degree in Biochemistry and Cell Biology from Rockefeller University in New York City in 1977, supervised by Zanvil Cohn. He continued his postdoctoral research at Rockefeller and then began a postdoctoral fellowship at Harvard Medical School, first with Melvin J. Glimcher and later with Jerome Gross.

Academic career
Tuan began his independent research career in 1980 when he joined the department of biology at the University of Pennsylvania. In 1988 he moved to Thomas Jefferson University, where he held joint appointments in the departments of orthopaedic surgery and biochemistry and molecular biology. He served as the director of orthopaedic research and vice chair of the department, and later took on the role of academic director of the institution's MD-PhD joint degree program. He also worked to develop a Ph.D. program in cell and tissue engineering, launched in 1997 and noted as the first such program in the US.

In 2001 Tuan left Jefferson to take an intramural research position at the National Institute of Arthritis and Musculoskeletal and Skin Diseases (NIAMS), one of the United States National Institutes of Health, where he became chief of the newly established Cartilage Biology and Orthopaedics Branch. Eight years later, he and his wife, fellow NIH scientist Cecilia Lo, were recruited to the University of Pittsburgh, where Tuan joined the departments of orthopaedic surgery and bioengineering and became the founding director of the newly established Center for Cellular and Molecular Engineering. He was appointed the Arthur J. Rooney Sr. Professor of Sports Medicine in 2010. Two years later, he assumed the directorship of the University of Pittsburgh's Center for Military Medicine Research and associate directorship of the McGowan Institute for Regenerative Medicine.

Tuan is a founding editor-in-chief of the scientific journal Stem Cell Research & Therapy and the editor of Birth Defects Research Part C: Embryo Today. He and Lo co-edited a three-volume book titled Developmental Biology Protocols.

In 2017, Tuan was appointed as the eighth vice-chancellor and president of the Chinese University of Hong Kong in his native city. He took up the post in January 2018. 

During the 2019–20 Hong Kong protests, he was initially condemned by CUHK students for failing to criticise police excesses, but later won plaudits after an evening-long discussion with them in public and private. On 18 October 2019, Tuan released an open letter in which he detailed some of the alleged police abuses that he had heard from his students. He called these "serious allegations from a human rights point of view" and urged the police to protect the rights of those arrested. He said he would write to Chief Executive Carrie Lam requesting an independent investigation of his students' cases outside existing mechanisms. This earned Tuan the condemnation of several police groups, who wrote that CUHK had "reduced itself to a hub of anti-China, Hong Kong independence forces". He was named as one of the world's most influential academics by Times Higher Education in December 2019 as he has reached out to students, called for end to violence, and "stood up for his campus and students...  despite being criticised by establishment figures".

Research
Tuan's research group focuses on bioengineering and tissue regeneration as applied to the musculoskeletal system, with an interest in translational research. Tuan's group has expertise in the study of adult stem cells and in the development of the musculoskeletal system. Among their efforts is a research project aimed at using 3D printing technology to restore function of joints damaged by diseases such as osteoarthritis, and work funded in 2016 to study model systems on the International Space Station.

Awards and honors
 Elected to the College of Fellows of the American Institute for Medical and Biological Engineering, 2000
 Marshall R. Urist Award, Orthopaedic Research Society, 2004
 Carnegie Science Center Life Sciences Award, 2016
 Clemson Award for Contributions to the Literature, Society for Biomaterials, 2016

References

External links
 Seminar by Rocky Tuan, University of Michigan School of Dentistry, 2013
 Award video, Carnegie Science Center Life Sciences Award, 2016
 Curriculum vitae of Professor Rocky S. Tuan - CUHK Communications and Public Relations Office

Living people
University of Pittsburgh faculty
Vice-Chancellors of the Chinese University of Hong Kong
21st-century American engineers
Rockefeller University alumni
Berea College alumni
Hong Kong engineers
University of Pennsylvania faculty
Thomas Jefferson University faculty
National Institutes of Health faculty
American people of Chinese descent
Alumni of Queen's College, Hong Kong
1951 births
Members of the Election Committee of Hong Kong, 2021–2026